Elizabeth Ann Crumb (May 25, 1950 – October 31,
2019) was an American actress and singer.

Career
The daughter of composer George Crumb and mother Elizabeth Crumb, pianist, and sister of composer David Crumb, she made her Broadway debut in 1987 as a member of the original cast of Les Misérables. Her other Broadway credits include Chess, Anna Karenina, for which she was nominated for the Tony Award for Best Actress in a Musical in 1993, and Aspects of Love, as Rose Vibert, a role she originated in the West End.

Crumb toured in the title role of Evita and appeared in numerous regional theatre productions staged by the Guthrie, Coconut Grove Playhouse, and Tennessee Repertory Theatre, among others. Her television credits include the daytime soaps As the World Turns, The Guiding Light, and Another World, and the primetime dramas Law & Order and Law & Order: Criminal Intent. She was in pre-production for a mini-series entitled The Road to Saint Lazarre in which she was to portray famed spy Mata Hari.

Crumb's recordings include A Broadway Diva Swings, a concert version of Nine with Jonathan Pryce and Elaine Paige, and Unto the Hills, in collaboration with her father.

Personal life
Crumb was committed to the cause of animal rescue and adoption. In December, 2009, she co-ordinated a “doglift” of over 50 dogs, all slated for euthanasia at shelters in the Midwest to no-kill rescues in the Northeast where homes could be found for them. Crumb was born in Charleston, West Virginia.

Crumb died on October 31, 2019, at her parents' home in Media, Pennsylvania from ovarian cancer, aged 69.

References

External links
 Official website
 
 

1950 births
2019 deaths
American musical theatre actresses
American women pop singers
American sopranos
American stage actresses
American television actresses
Musicians from Charleston, West Virginia
20th-century American women singers
21st-century American women singers
20th-century American actresses
21st-century American actresses
Singers from West Virginia
Actresses from West Virginia
Deaths from ovarian cancer
University of Michigan alumni
20th-century American singers
21st-century American singers
Actors from Charleston, West Virginia